Then Gunnison Massacre Site, in Millard County, Utah near Hinckley, Utah, was listed on the National Register of Historic Places in 1976.

It is the site of the 1853 "Gunnison massacre", in which John W. Gunnison and seven of his railroad survey party were killed, purportedly by Pah Vent Native Americans, possibly with contention between the Native Americans and Mormons over water being involved.

A stone monument with a bronze marker was placed at the site in 1927.  The marker included a description of the event and names of the men killed.  The bronze marker was stolen before the 1976 listing.

References

Massacres by Native Americans
National Register of Historic Places in Millard County, Utah
Buildings and structures completed in 1853
Massacres in the United States
Conflict sites on National Register of Historic Places in Utah